Capriati may refer to:

 Jennifer Capriati, American former world No. 1 tennis player
 Joseph Capriati, Italian DJ and music producer
 Capriati a Volturno, municipality in the Province of Caserta in the Italian region Campania, Italy